Boxing magazine The Ring began naming the top 10 pound for pound boxers in 1989. The first #1 pound for pound fighter was heavyweight champion Mike Tyson. To reduce the number of tables, a table is added only if there are rank changes in the rankings. For WBA titles, only titles in the primary champion lineage are listed.

Current pound for pound rankings

2020 – present

2022

2021

2020

2010 – 2019

2019

2018

2017

2016

2015

2014

2013

2012

2011

2010

2000 – 2009

2009

2008

2007

2006

2005

2004

1990 – 1999

1997

See also
List of fights between two The Ring pound for pound boxers
 Boxing pound for pound rankings
 The Ring
List of current world boxing champions
List of undisputed boxing champions
List of WBA world champions
List of WBC world champions
List of IBF world champions
List of WBO world champions
 List of The Ring world champions

References

External links
Official list of current Ring champions
https://boxrec.com/media/index.php/The_Ring_Magazine%27s_Annual_Ratings

World champions
Ring world champions
Ring